Kutkivtsi (translit. Kutkovtsy; also referred to as Kudkiv or Kutkiw) is a village (selo) in Kamianets-Podilskyi Raion of Khmelnytskyi Oblast in western Ukraine. It belongs to Zakupne settlement hromada, one of the hromadas of Ukraine.

Kutkivtsi is the birthplace of Ukrainian-Canadian war hero Filip Konowal (Pylyp Konoval).

Until 18 July 2020, Kutkivtsi belonged to Chemerivtsi Raion. The raion was abolished in July 2020 as part of the administrative reform of Ukraine, which reduced the number of raions of Khmelnytskyi Oblast to three. The area of Chemerivtsi Raion was merged into Kamianets-Podilskyi Raion.

References

External links
 Кутківці (Ukrainian language)

Podolia Governorate

Villages in Kamianets-Podilskyi Raion